Germano Celant (11 September 1940 – 29 April 2020) was an Italian art historian, critic, and curator who coined the term "Arte Povera" (poor art) in the 1967 Flash Art piece "Appunti Per Una Guerriglia" ("Notes on a guerrilla war"), which would become the manifesto for the Arte Povera artistic and political movement. He wrote many articles and books on the subject.

Work 
Germano Celant was born in Genoa, Italy. He attended the University of Genoa, where he studied history of art with Eugenio Battisti. In 1963 he worked as assistant editor for Marcatrè, a Genoa-based magazine about architecture, art, design, music and literature founded by Rodolfo Vitone, Eugenio Battisti, Paolo Portoghesi, Diego Carpitella, Maurizio Calvesi, Umberto Eco, Vittorio Gelmetti and Edoardo Sanguineti. In 1967, his manifesto of Arte Povera, Notes for a Guerilla War, was published in Flash Art. The concept of Arte Povera seemed to be that in Italy art was quite different from America due to the different circumstances at the time. Italy was going through an industrial period but was not really making the pop art that coincided with the established economy as opposed to American artists like Warhol, Robert Rauschenberg, and other pop artists. The Italian artists were going for a humanism in their art and not for the coolness and calculated machine-made imagery of the pop artists.

"Arte Povera" was essentially formed around two nuclei: one in Turin, with artists such as Michelangelo Pistoletto, Mario Merz, Marisa Merz, Giuseppe Penone, Giulio Paolini, Giovanni Anselmo, and Piero Gilardi; and one in Rome, with Alighiero Boetti, Jannis Kounellis and Pino Pascali. Celant went on to organize Arte Povera exhibitions at Galleria La Bertesca in Genoa (1967), Galleria De' Foscherari in Bologna (1968), and a three-day performance event called "Arte Povera & Azioni Povere at Amalfi" (1968).

In 1974, Celant edited and curated the Catalogue Raisonné of Italian artist Piero Manzoni. He curated many exhibitions on Italian art, including "Identité italienne. L'art en Italie depuis 1959" (Centre Georges Pompidou, Paris, 1981), "Italian art, 1900–1945" (Palazzo Grassi, Venice, 1989; with Pontus Hultén), and "Italian Metamorphosis 1943–1968" (Guggenheim Museum, New York, 1994). In 1997, he was the director of the Venice Biennale and in 2004, he curated the exhibition "Art and Architecture" in Genoa when the city was nominated as European Capital of Culture. From 1977, he was a contributing editor to Artforum and from 1991 he was a contributing editor to Interview.

In 1988, Celant was appointed Senior Curator of Contemporary Art at the Solomon R. Guggenheim Museum in New York City.

From 1993 on Celant served as Artistic Director of the Prada Foundation in Milan, which began as PradaMilanoarte that year. Under his leadership, the foundation over the years presented shows of Walter de Maria, Louise Bourgeois, Anish Kapoor, David Smith, Michael Heizer, Sam Taylor-Wood, and Steve McQueen, among others, in Milan and Venice. In conjunction with the Venice Biennale 2009, Celant organized the second major survey of John Wesley, at the boarding-school buildings on the island of San Giorgio Maggiore, Venice. His 2012 show "The Small Utopia. Ars Multiplicata" at Ca' Corner della Regina, Venice, tackled the issue of art in the age of mechanical reproduction and how artists from Marcel Duchamp to Andy Warhol have used multiplication of various sorts. It contained over 600 items, produced between 1900 and 1975, and included design, ceramics, glassware, textiles, film, magazines, books, and sound recordings.

Celant curated exhibitions at other venues. In collaboration with the Fondazione Lucio Fontana, he mounted the 2012 survey “Lucio Fontana: Ambienti Spaziali” at Gagosian Gallery, New York.

In 2016 he was the Project Director of The Floating Piers, Christo and Jeanne-Claudes work at Lago d'Iseo.

Personal life 
Celant was married to fellow curator Paris Murray. In 2006, the couple purchased a Milan paper factory building converted by the architect Pierluigi Cerri into a 10,000-square-foot house.

Death
On 29 April 2020, Celant died in Milan from COVID-19 during the COVID-19 pandemic in Italy. He was 79.

References

External links
 

Italian art critics
Italian art curators
1940 births
2020 deaths
Writers from Genoa
Italian male non-fiction writers
Venice Biennale artistic directors
Deaths from the COVID-19 pandemic in Lombardy
Arte Povera